Alberta Provincial Highway No. 21, commonly referred to as Highway 21, is a north–south highway in Alberta, Canada that parallels Highway 2 between Calgary and Edmonton. It begins at the Trans-Canada Highway (Highway 1) east of Strathmore, and ends at Fort Saskatchewan where it is succeeded by Highway 15. The northernmost  of the highway are twinned. Highway 21 runs roughly parallel to the main north–south CN rail line between Calgary and Edmonton between Three Hills and Looma.

Route description 
Highway 21 continues to the town of Three Hills, home of Prairie Bible Institute, passing along the town's eastern edge. North of Three Hills, the CN rail line begins to run parallel to the highway, serving most of the communities along the route. Highway 21 passes the hamlet of Huxley and the access road to Dry Island Buffalo Jump Provincial Park before entering Red Deer County; the Kneehill / Red Deer county boundary also signifies the transition from the prairie to aspen parkland ecosystem, with increasing foliage. Highway 21 bypasses Elnora and Lousana prior to Delburne, skirting its western edge on a bypass constructed in the 1980s. North of Delburne, Highway 21 reaches a T intersection with Highway 595 and turns east for  along Township Road 380, then north at Range Road 231, the former alignment through Delburne. The roadway narrows for the following  as it heads towards the Red Deer River, which it crosses at the Content Bridge. North of the Red Deer River, it briefly enters Stettler County, crossing Highway 11 and Highway 12.

It passes by the hamlet of Mirror before entering Camrose County, passing northwest of Buffalo Lake. The route bypasses Bashaw, concurrent with Highway 53 , then continues north past Ferintosh and the hamlets of New Norway and Duhamel, crossing the Battle River at an area locally known as Ross' Flats. It continues north past the hamlet of Armena and village of Hay Lakes, entering Leduc County just south of the hamlet of New Sarepta, into the eastern portion of the Edmonton Metropolitan Region. North of the hamlet Looma, it enters Strathcona County and reaches an interchange with Highway 14. It becomes a divided highway, passing along the eastern edge of Sherwood Park prior to an interchange at Highway 16. Highway 21 continues north to the city of Fort Saskatchewan in which it ends at Highway 15.

History 
The southern terminus of Highway 21 was originally at Highway 9 in the village of Beiseker, travelled north for  along present-day Highway 806 to the village of Acme, travelled east for approximately  along present-day Highway 575, before turning north towards Three Hills.

The section from Fort Saskatchewan to Highway 16 was originally designated as Highway 55.  By 1960, Highway 21 terminated at Highway 14 southwest of Edmonton.  In the 1970s, Highway 21 was extended north from Highway 14 past Sherwood Park to Highway 16, while Highway 55 was renumbered and became part of Highway 21. The section of Highway 21 previously designated as 55 was twinned in the 1980s, and the section adjacent to Sherwood Park was completed in late 2009.

Future 
Alberta Transportation has long-term plans to replace the Content Bridge across the Red Deer River with a new crossing north of Delburne. Right-of-way is protected from the Highway 595 intersection to Highway 11 southwest of Alix, as well as from the current Highway 21 north / Highway 12 intersection south to Highway 11 – internally designated as Highway 921. There is no timeline on construction.

Alberta Transportation, in partnership with the City of Edmonton, City of Fort Saskatchewan, Strathcona County, and Sturgeon County, is also studying a new North Saskatchewan River crossing in northeast Edmonton that would include a new roadway from the Highway 15 / Highway 28A intersection to Highway 21 south of Fort Saskatchewan. The study is still in the early stages, but proposals show that Highway 21 might be realigned so that through traffic would flow from Highway 16 to the new bridge and tie into Highway 28A.  The final alignment has not been determined and it is not yet known if it would be designated as part of Highway 21. The proposed bridge and its connecting roads will not be constructed for another 25 to 35 years. There are also long-term plans to upgrade Highway 21 to expressway/freeway standards from the northeast river crossing to Highway 625 as part of a High Load/Heavy Haul bypass connecting Nisku to northeastern Alberta and Fort McMurray.

Major intersections 
Starting from the south end of Highway 21:

References 

021
Fort Saskatchewan
Roads in Strathcona County